Babiya was a former village development committee in Sunsari District in the Kosi Zone of south-eastern Nepal.Currently it merged with District Headquarter Inaruwa municipality.  At the time of the 1991 Nepal census it had a population of 5546 people living in 888 individual households. major castes of this VDC are Yadav, Muslims, Shah, Mehta and others.

References

Populated places in Sunsari District